The fourth season of The Fresh Prince of Bel-Air premiered on September 20, 1993 and concluded on May 23, 1994. This is the first season to feature Daphne Maxwell Reid as Vivian Banks after Janet Hubert-Whitten's departure. With 26 episodes, this is the longest season of The Fresh Prince of Bel-Air. Season 4 was originally meant to be the final season of the show, but NBC renewed the show for two more seasons.

Episodes 

 Will Smith, James Avery, Alfonso Ribeiro and Karyn Parsons were present for all episodes.
 Tatyana M. Ali and Joseph Marcell were absent for one episode each.
 Daphne Maxwell Reid was absent for three episodes.
 DJ Jazzy Jeff was present for twelve episodes.

References

External links 

 
 

1993 American television seasons
1994 American television seasons
The Fresh Prince of Bel-Air seasons